The discography of L.A. Guns, an American hard rock band, consists of seventeen studio releases (fourteen original studio albums, two cover albums and one re-recording album), nine live albums, 13 compilation albums, four extended plays, 27 singles, six video albums and 25 music videos. After some early lineup changes, the group – consisting of vocalist Phil Lewis, lead guitarist Tracii Guns, rhythm guitarist Mick Cripps, bassist Kelly Nickels and drummer Nickey Alexander – signed with PolyGram and released its self-titled debut album in 1988. It reached number 50 on the US Billboard 200 and was certified gold by the Recording Industry Association of America (RIAA). Alexander was replaced by Steve Riley, and the 1989 follow-up Cocked & Loaded reached number 38 on the Billboard 200. The single "The Ballad of Jayne" gave L.A. Guns its debut on the Hot 100, reaching number 33.

Hollywood Vampires, released in 1991, reached number 42 on the Billboard 200. Three of the album's four singles charted on the Mainstream Rock chart, and "It's Not Over Now" charted at number 62 on the Hot 100. After the band's fourth album Vicious Circle failed to chart in the US, L.A. Guns was dropped by PolyGram and went through a number of lineup changes, with Lewis, Cripps and Nickels leaving in 1995. The band continued to issue new albums throughout the 1990s, with limited commercial success. The group also went through a long line of personnel changes: 1996's American Hardcore featured new vocalist Chris Van Dahl and bassist Johnny Crypt, the 1998 EP Wasted featured Crypt and vocalist Ralph Saenz, and 1999's Shrinking Violet featured Crypt and vocalist Jizzy Pearl.

The classic lineup of Lewis, Guns, Cripps, Nickels and Riley reunited in 1999 to record Cocked & Re-Loaded, a new version of the group's second album. 2001's Man in the Moon featured Mark "Muddy Stardust" Dutton on bass, and 2002's Waking the Dead was recorded by a four-piece lineup of Lewis, Guns, Riley and Adam Hamilton, after which founding member Guns left the band. After three albums without the guitarist, Lewis and Guns reunited for the first time since 2002 in 2016. In 2017 the band released The Missing Peace, which reached number 16 on the Billboard Hard Rock Albums chart and number 12 on the Independent Albums chart. The Devil You Know was released as the album's follow-up in March 2019. Checkered Past was released on November 21, 2021. Tracii Guns' version of the band will release  Black Diamonds in 2023. Steve Riley's version of the band will release The Dark Horse on July 14, 2023.

Albums

Studio albums

Cover albums

Re-recording albums

Live albums

Compilations

Extended plays

Singles

Videos

Video albums

Music videos

Other appearances

References

External links
L.A. Guns official website

L.A. Guns
L.A. Guns
L.A. Guns